Robert Hooker (born 6 March 1967) is an Australian former soccer player and coach.  He played for and later became assistant coach of the Australian national team.

Playing career
Hooker started his playing career with Mount Colah Soccer Club and was a graduate of the Australian Institute of Sport Football Program, granted a scholarship in 1984 and 1985.  This led to selection in the Australia U20 side for the 1985 FIFA World Youth Championship finals.

Through his playing career, Hooker played in the NSL for Sydney City, Sydney Olympic, West Adelaide, Sydney United, Marconi, Canberra Cosmos and Auckland Kingz.  He later finished his career in the NSW Premier League with APIA Leichhardt and Belconnen Blue Devils.

He was first selected for the Socceroos in 1990, coming on as a substitute against touring club side Hajduk Split.  He would make his first appearance in an 'A' international later that year away to South Korea.
From 1995 to 1998 he was a regular selection in the national team, including inclusion in the 1997 FIFA Confederations Cup squad.

|}

Coaching
After his playing career, he took up coaching in women's football, first in the United States before returning to Australia. In 2008/2009, Hooker joined W-League club, Canberra United as its inaugural coach. He only stayed on as manager of United for one season. In 2010, following the appointment of Holger Osieck as Socceroos head coach, Hooker and Aurelio Vidmar were employed as assistants.

References

External links
Canberra United – Coach profile
OzFootball Player Database – Hooker, Robert
1986 season matrix with Sydney City at ozfootball.net
1987 season matrix with Sydney Olympic at ozfootball.net
1992/93 season matrix with West Adelaide at ozfootball.net

1967 births
Living people
Australian soccer players
Australia international soccer players
National Soccer League (Australia) players
APIA Leichhardt FC players
Canberra Cosmos FC players
Football Kingz F.C. players
Marconi Stallions FC players
Sydney Olympic FC players
Sydney United 58 FC players
West Adelaide SC players
1996 OFC Nations Cup players
1997 FIFA Confederations Cup players
Australian Institute of Sport soccer players
Association football defenders